Buble may refer to:
Bublje, hamlet in Kosovo also called Buble
 Michael Bublé (born 1975), Canadian singer

See also
Bouble, French river